The following lists events in the year 2021 in Panama.

Incumbents
 President: Laurentino Cortizo
 Vice President: José Gabriel Carrizo

Events
Ongoing — COVID-19 pandemic in Panama
January 29 – Panama reopens its land borders for the first time since March 2020, setting off a new wave of migration.

Deaths

January to March
12 January – Adolfo Paredes, 43, lawyer.
26 January – Richard Holzer, architect (born 1923).
4 February – Jaime Murrell, 71, Christian singer and songwriter; COVID-19.
7 February – Roberto Hansell, 68, footballer (Tauro FC).
9 February – Diógenes Vergara, 50, politician, Deputy (2014–2019); shot.
25 February – Frank Holness, 82, basketball player; cerebral ischemia.
2 March – Telma Barria Pinzón, diplomat (consul of Panama in Colombia); drowned
3 March – Tomas Altamirano Duque, 93, politician, Vice President of Panama (1994–1999).

See also

References

 
2020s in Panama
Years of the 21st century in Panama
Panama
Panama